Sir Hugh Charles Philip Bidwell  (1 November 1934 – 7 December 2013) was a British businessman and the 662nd Lord Mayor of London in 1989–90. Prior to his election as mayor Bidwell was an alderman of the Billingsgate ward from 1979 to 1996, and a sheriff of the City of London in 1986. Bidwell was appointed a Knight Grand Cross of the Order of the British Empire (GBE) on his election as mayor.

Bidwell was born in 1934, the son of a wine importer, and was schooled at Stonyhurst. Undergoing National Service in the East Surrey Regiment in 1953, he served in Nyasaland, Kenya with the 1st Btn King's African Rifles.
 
Bidwell began working in the food industry with the breakfast cereal maker Viota, and the became a director of Viota in 1962. Bidwell was subsequently chairman of the food company Pearce Duff, headed the food arm of Gill & Duffus, and joined Allied Lyons in 1985.
 
Bidwell was married twice, first to Jenifer Webb in 1962, with whom he had two sons, and a daughter. Webb died in 2001. Bidwell married for a second time to Priscilla Pode (née Hunter). His wife and three children survived him at his death.

Bidwell was buried with his first wife in the cemetery of Holy Cross Church, Goodnestone, Kent.

References

1934 births
2013 deaths
King's African Rifles officers
20th-century British Army personnel 
20th-century British businesspeople 
21st-century British businesspeople 
Knights Grand Cross of the Order of the British Empire
Sheriffs of the City of London
20th-century lord mayors of London
20th-century English politicians
East Surrey Regiment officers
People from Goodnestone, Dover

People educated at Stonyhurst College